Alan Hill (born 22 June 1955) is an English former professional footballer, spending most of his footballing career (and all of his professional footballing career) playing in the English Football League with Wrexham, making over 200 total appearances for the club.

Career
Hill signed for Wrexham as a schoolboy. He made his first team debut in 1975 aged 19.

Hill would prove a versatile player, playing in nine different positions during his time at Wrexham, including a game as goalkeeper in the Welsh Cup.

After over 10 years at Wrexham, Hill would move to Oswestry Town for the final year of his career.

References

Living people
1955 births
English footballers
Association football defenders
English Football League players
Wrexham A.F.C. players
Oswestry Town F.C. players
Sportspeople from Chester